Tappeh Bashi may refer to:
 Tappeh Bashi, Ardabil
 Tappeh Bashi, West Azerbaijan
 Tappeh Bashi, Poldasht, West Azerbaijan Province
 Tappeh Bashi, Showt, West Azerbaijan Province